Hamzehabad may refer to various palaces in Iran:
 Hamzehabad, Chaharmahal and Bakhtiari
 Hamzehabad, Kermanshah
 Hamzehabad, Mazandaran
 Hamzehabad, Sistan and Baluchestan
 Hamzehabad, Tehran
 Hamzehabad, Bukan, West Azerbaijan Province
 Hamzehabad, Mahabad, West Azerbaijan Province
 Hamzehabad-e Olya, West Azerbaijan Province
 Hamzehabad-e Sofla, West Azerbaijan Province
 Hamzehabad, Zanjan